Lesley Joy Rogers (born 31 July 1943) is a neurobiologist and emeritus professor of neuroscience and animal behaviour at the University of New England.

Academic career and education
Rogers obtained Bachelor of Science with honours at the University of Adelaide in 1964. She worked in various positions at Harvard University, New England Medical Centre Hospital, University of Sussex, and Open University. She obtained her Doctor of Philosophy in 1971 and a Doctor of Science in 1987, both from the University of Sussex.

In 2000, Rogers was made a Fellow of the Australian Academy of Science.

In 2003, she was awarded the Clarke Medal in zoology from the Royal Society of New South Wales, and also received the Vice-Chancellor's Award for Excellence in Research, the Academic Women's Special Achievement Award and also the Centenary Medal in 2003.

In 2009, Rogers was a member of the Voiceless Scientific Expert Advisory Panel.

Publications

Professor Rogers has published over 200 journal articles and 14 books predominantly focussing on the brain and development.

Selected books 
Rogers, L.J. and Vallortigara, G. (eds) (2017) Lateralized Brain Functions: Methods in Human and Non-human Species. Springer Nature, Humana Press.  . (Print) 978-1-4939-6725-4 (Online). NeuroMethods Series, vol. 122.
Rogers, Lesley J; Vallortigara, Giorgio; Andrew, Richard J (2013). "Divided Brains: The Biology and Behaviour of Brain Asymmetries". Cambridge University Press . .
Rogers, L.J. and Kaplan, G. (2004) Comparative Vertebrate Cognition: Are Primates Superior to Nonprimates? Kluwer Academic/Plenum, New York. . 
Kaplan, G. and Rogers, L.J. (2003) Gene Worship: Moving Beyond the Nature/Nurture Debate Over Genes, Brain, and Gender. OtherPress, New York. .  
Rogers, L.J. and Andrew, R.J. (2002) Comparative Vertebrate Lateralization. Cambridge University Press, New York. . Re-issued in 2008 -  Hbk and 978-0-521-78700-0 Pbk.
Kaplan, G. and Rogers, L.J. (1999) The Orang-utans. Allen and Unwin, St Leonards. . Also published by Perseus/Hellix Press, N.Y., 2000. .
Rogers, L.J. and Kaplan, G. (2000) Song, Roars and Rituals: Communication in Birds, Mammals and Other Animals. Harvard University Press, Cambridge, MA. .
Rogers, L.J. (1999) Sexing the Brain. Weidenfeld and Nicolson, London . Also published by Columbia University Press, New York in 2001 (hardback  and paperback 023112011) and by Phoenix Paperback, London, in 2000.
Rogers, L.J. (1997) Minds of their Own: Animal Thinking and Awareness. Allen and Unwin, St Leonards . Also published by Westview Press, Colorado, in 1998 .
Rogers, L.J.  (1995) The Development of Brain and Behaviour in the Chicken, CAB International, Wallingford, UK. .
Bradshaw, J.L. and Rogers, L.J. (1993) The Evolution of Lateral Asymmetries, Language, Tool Use and Intellect, Academic Press. .

Selected Journal articles 
(refereed research papers only)

;

Selected Book Chapters 

Rogers, L.J. (2017) Eye and ear preferences. In Rogers, L.J. and Vallortigara, G. (eds) Lateralized Brain Functions: Methods in Human and Non-human Species. Humana Press, Springer NeuroMethods Series, vol. 122, pp. 79–102. .
Rogers, L.J. (2011) Sex differences are not “hard-wired”. In J.A. Fisher (ed) Gender and the Science of Difference: Cultural Politics of Contemporary Science and Medicine. Rutgers University Press, New Jersey, pp. 27–42.  pbk and 978-0-8135-5047-3hbk.

Rogers, L.J. and Kaplan, G. (2004) All animals are not equal: the interface between scientific knowledge and the legislation for animal rights? In C.R. Sunstein and M. C. Nussbaum (eds.) Animal Rights: Law and Policy. Oxford University Press, Oxford, pp. 175–202.
Rogers, L.J. (2002) Lateralization in vertebrates: Its early evolution, general pattern and development. Advances in the Study of Behavior, Vol. 31, ed. by P.J.B. Slater, J. Rosenblatt, C. Snowdon and T. Roper (eds), Academic Press, San Diego, pp. 107–162..
Rogers, L.J. (2000) Evolution of side biases: Motor versus sensory lateralization. In M.K. Manas, M.B. Bulman-Fleming and G. Tiwari (eds) Side-Bias: A Neuropsychological Perspective. Kluwer, Dordrecht, The Netherlands, pp. 3–40.
Rogers, L.J.  Development of Lateralisation.  In: R.J. Andrew (ed.), Neural and Behavioural Plasticity: The Use of the Domestic Chicken as a Model, Oxford University Press, Oxford, pp. 507–535 (1991).

References

Animal cognition writers
Australian neuroscientists
Australian women academics
University of Adelaide alumni
Fellows of the Australian Academy of Science
Australian women neuroscientists
Academic staff of the University of New England (Australia)
Alumni of the University of Sussex
1943 births
Living people